Francis James Barmby (21 December 1863 – 30 September 1936) was an English cricketer.  Barmby was a right-handed batsman who bowled right-arm medium pace.  The son of Rev. James Barmby, he was born at Pittington, County Durham, where his father was the Rector.  He was later educated at Charterhouse School.

While studying at Magdalen College, Oxford, Barmby made a single first-class appearance for Oxford University Cricket Club against Lancashire at Old Trafford in 1885.  During this match, he was dismissed for a duck by Alexander Watson in their first-innings, while in their second-innings he made 6 runs, before being dismissed by Johnny Briggs.  This was his only first-class appearance for the university.

He later made two Minor Counties Championship appearances for Berkshire; in 1900 against Oxfordshire and in 1909 against Buckinghamshire.

In other sports, he won a Blue for Association football in 1886 and was also a good rackets player.

He became a schoolmaster and sub-warden at Radley College, the public school near Abingdon, Oxfordshire. He died on 30 September 1936 at Oxford.

References

External links
Francis Barmby at ESPNcricinfo
Francis Barmby at CricketArchive

1863 births
1936 deaths
People from Pittington
Cricketers from County Durham
People educated at Charterhouse School
Alumni of Magdalen College, Oxford
English cricketers
Oxford University cricketers
Berkshire cricketers